Muhammad Shahrel Fikri bin Mohd Fauzi (born 17 October 1994) is a Malaysian professional footballer who plays for Negeri Sembilan in the Malaysia Super League and the Malaysia national team mainly as a left winger but can also play as a forward.

Club career

Beginnings
Born in Tawau, Sabah, but raised in Sitiawan in Manjung, a district that is approximately 80 km southwest of Ipoh, Perak. Shahrel began his football career at Perak U-21 in 2013 as the team played in Malaysia President Cup and King's Gold Cup. He managed to score 10 goals during his debut season and has scored 30 goals over 3 seasons with the team. Shahrel also represented Perak state team in 2014 Sukma Games hosted by Perlis. He scored 2 goals as Perak beat Johor 3–1 in the final.

Shahrel has been offered a contract to play with Harimau Muda B in early 2014 but failed the medical test due to a heart problem.

PKNP FC
Shahrel joined Malaysia FAM League club PKNP FC in 2016 from Perak U-21 team. He made his league debut in 0–0 draw in away match against KDMM coming from bench on 28 February 2016. His first and second goals for PKNP FC came from 0–5 win over PBMM on 9 March 2017. Shahrel made 20 appearances and 13 goals in his debut season with PKNP FC.

After the end of the 2017 domestic season, Shahrel rumoured to be on his way out of the club, in a surprising turn of events, the club has just announced that Shahrel have instead extended his contract with the team until 2020. A whole host of clubs have been linked with the signature of Shahrel including Perak, Terengganu and Johor Darul Ta'zim.

Nakhon Ratchasima

Shahrel became the third Malaysian to play in the Thai League 1 in 2018, after he joined Nakhon Ratchasima on loan, on 25 June 2018. He made his debut for Nakhon Ratchasima in a 1–1 draw against Sukhothai on 30 June 2018. Shahrel scored his first goal in a League Cup tie against Ranong United, scoring the equaliser in 73rd minute of the match, the match finished 3–2.

Negeri Sembilan FC 
He was officially announced as a new Negeri Sembilan FC player on 8 January 2023.

International career
On 4 August 2017, Shahrel was called up for the Malaysia national team central training from 14 August to prepare for three international friendly matches and second Group B match of 2019 AFC Asian Cup qualification against Hong Kong on 5 September 2017.

Shahrel made his debut for Malaysia national team in a 1–2 friendly loss against Syria, replacing Syazwan Zainon for the final 23 minutes in Malacca, Malaysia. On 10 September 2018, Shahrel scored his first international goal in the match against Cambodia.
Shahrel scored his first international hat-trick in the joint World Cup 2022 and Asia Cup 2023 qualifier match against Timor Leste on June 11, 2019.

Career statistics

Club

International

International goals
''As of match played 11 June 2019. Malaysia score listed first, score column indicates score after each Shahrel Fikri goal.

Honours

Youth
Perak U21
Sukma Games
 Gold Medal: 2014

Club
PKNP FC
Malaysia FAM League runner-up: 2016

Individual
FAM Football Awards
Best Striker Award: 2017

References

External links
 
 

1994 births
Living people
Malaysian footballers
Malaysian expatriate footballers
PKNP FC players
Nakhon Ratchasima F.C. players
Selangor FA players
Negeri Sembilan FC players
Thai League 1 players
Expatriate footballers in Thailand
Malaysian expatriate sportspeople in Thailand
People from Perak
Association football forwards
Malaysia international footballers
Malaysian people of Malay descent